Dean Jacob Hachamovitch  is a former corporate vice president in charge of the Internet Explorer team at Microsoft.

Early life and education 
Dean Hachamovitch was born to Shoshana and Dr. Moshe Hachamovitch in New York City. His mother was an office manager at Alpha Surgical Enterprises, while his father was an obstetrician and gynaecologist and an assistant professor at Albert Einstein College of Medicine.

Dean Hachamovitch holds a Bachelor of Arts in mathematics from Harvard University.

Career 
Hachamovitch joined Microsoft after graduating from Harvard in 1990, and has worked as a product unit manager for Zone.com, part of Microsoft's online gaming branch. He had also worked on Microsoft Office. Later, he became the general manager of the Internet Explorer Team. During his time on the IE team, he was promoted to corporate vice president before later leaving for an unspecified new role at Microsoft in November 2013.

During his career at Microsoft, Hachamovitch has been involved in the invention of several technologies which were subsequently patented by Microsoft, including AutoComplete, AutoCorrect and progress animation.

Personal life 
Dean Hachamovitch married Joan Morse in October 1993, when they both worked at Microsoft. The couple has three children.

References

External links 
 Internet Explorer weblog

Year of birth missing (living people)
Living people
20th-century American inventors
21st-century American inventors
American Jews
American technology writers
Harvard College alumni
Internet Explorer
Microsoft employees